Matti Valentin Huhta (February 14, 1880 –  May 15, 1942), better known by his pen name T-Bone Slim, was an American humorist, poet, songwriter, hobo, and labor activist, who played a prominent role in the Industrial Workers of the World (IWW).

Nickname
T-Bone Slim was a relatively frequent nickname. In addition to Matti Huhta, the nickname T-Bone Slim was also used by the miner William Vann, the labor organizer Al W. McBride, and various other unidentified individuals, often transients.

Life
Huhta was born in Ashtabula, Ohio, to Matti and Johanna Huhta, Finnish immigrants from Kälviä, Finland. As a young man he married Rosa Kotila of Ashtabula, with whom he had four children. The marriage ended when the children were young, and he left Ohio, having no further contact with Rosa or the children.

Huhta worked briefly as a reporter for the daily News-Tribune in Duluth, Minnesota but resigned after an editor "misquoted him and balled up his article" about an Industrial Workers of the World (IWW) mass meeting. According to one account, this was when he joined the IWW or "Wobblies", as they are sometimes called. Huhta contributed numerous articles and songs to IWW publications over a period of twenty years and was widely regarded as one of the union's finest writers. He was a regular columnist for Industrial Solidarity and later wrote for the Industrial Worker and Industrialisti.

In addition to his writing, Huhta supported himself in various ways. His experience working on docks and barges around the country had by the mid-1930s garnered him a position as barge captain in New York City.

Death
On May 15, 1942 at 5:45 pm, a patrolman found a body floating near Pier 9 on the East River. The body had been in the water for about four days, and showed no obvious signs of external injury. The case was ruled a drowning, and police speculated that the person had been drunk, fallen in the water, and drowned. The body was identified, but the records do not tell us who identified it. However, the body was not claimed, and was buried in a pauper's grave on Hart Island.

Legacy
Following his death, T-Bone Slim became a source of inspiration for the emerging American surrealist movement, and during the 1960s there was renewed interest in his songs when they were sung by activists during the Civil Rights Movement. In an interview, Noam Chomsky cited T-Bone Slim as one of his favorite Wobbly singers.

A number of T-Bone Slim's songs can be found in the Little Red Songbook. Among the best known are The Popular Wobbly, Mysteries Of A Hobo's Life, and The Lumberjack's Prayer. First published by the IWW in 1909, the songbook has never gone out of print. The IWW brought out the 38th edition in 2010  and the Charles H. Kerr Publishing Company has other works by T-Bone Slim in its catalog. For a long time, there were no known photographs of T-Bone Slim, but the cartoon sketch at the head of his column was said to have been a good likeness. However, in 2019 photos of him resurfaced.

The first Finnish translation of T-Bone Slim's writings was published in 2013.

Musician John Westmoreland, who is a grandnephew of T-Bone Slim, is working on a documentary and a music album on T-Bone Slim's life and poems.

Selected works
IWW Songbook 1920
Power of These Two Hands 1922 
Starving Amidst Too Much 1923

Quotes
"Wherever you find injustice, the proper form of politeness is attack."
"Always keep yourself fit to serve mankind. Watch yourself, do not watch the boss. Never exhaust yourself — there is nothing more disgusting than a man staggering home from work 'dog-tired', helplessly falling into a chair to have his child remove his shoes; then grabbing a hasty feverish supper; saying good-night to his family and rolling into bed half-washed, to repeat the same thing three hundred and twelve times per year, or until sickness puts a stop to his mad career."
"Tear Gas: the most effective agent used by employers to persuade their employees that the interests of capital and labor are identical."
Only the poor break laws—the rich evade them.

See also

Wesley Everest
Joe Hill
Frank Little
Utah Phillips

References

This article incorporates research by Jennifer Trask Ripley, using source material from the family and birth and death state archival records.

External links

Little Red Songbook
Images
Sketch of T-Bone Slim from his newspaper column
Juice Is Stranger Than Friction 1993
Starving Amidst Too Much 2005
Mielipuolipiteitä yes muita kirjoituksia 2013
Lyrics
Harvest Land (possibly written by T-Bone Slim)
I'm Too Old To Be A Scab
I Wanna Free Miss Liberty
The Lumberjack's Prayer
Mysteries Of A Hobo's Life
The Popular Wobbly
Videos

Streaming audio
Beulah Land (Harvest Land)
Just Before The Battle, Mother (I'm Too Old To Be A Scab)
My Sunny Tennessee (I Wanna Free Miss Liberty)
The Internet Archive
T-Bone Slim 
Songs of the Wobblies

Newberry Library

 Franklin Rosement/T-Bone Slim Research Collection at the Newberry Library

1880 births
1942 deaths
American alternative journalists
American male journalists
American people of Finnish descent
20th-century American poets
Hoboes
Industrial Workers of the World members
People from Ashtabula, Ohio
Songwriters from Ohio
Journalists from Ohio
20th-century American male writers
20th-century American non-fiction writers
American surrealist writers
Deaths by drowning in the United States
Burials on Hart Island
American trade unionists of Finnish descent